Badding is a 2000 Finnish biographical film about Finnish rock singer Rauli "Badding" Somerjoki.

Cast 
 Janne Reinikainen - Rauli "Badding" Somerjoki
 Karoliina Blackburn - Mari
 Peter Franzén - Ossi
  - Arde
 Ilkka Koivula - Albert Hilton
  - Frans Hilton
  - Äiti
  - Yli-Laakio
 Jenni Rautawaara - Viettelijätär
  - Naapurin mummo
  - Radiotoimittaja

References

External links 

2000s biographical films
Finnish biographical drama films